White Gull is an unincorporated community in northern Alberta, Canada within Athabasca County.

History 
White Gull incorporated as a summer village on January 1, 1983. It dissolved from village status on January 1, 2003.

Demographics 

See also 
List of former urban municipalities in Alberta

References 

Former summer villages in Alberta
Populated places disestablished in 2003
Localities in Athabasca County